Mensano is a village in Tuscany, central Italy, administratively a frazione of the comune of Casole d'Elsa, province of Siena. At the time of the 2001 census its population was 127.

Mensano is about 36 km from Siena and 8 km from Casole d'Elsa.

Main sights 
 San Giovanni Battista, main parish church of the village

References 

Frazioni of Casole d'Elsa